Terhi Suvi Hannele Markkanen (born 6 November 1973) is a Finnish biathlete. She competed in three events at the 1992 Winter Olympics.

References

1973 births
Living people
Biathletes at the 1992 Winter Olympics
Finnish female biathletes
Olympic biathletes of Finland
Place of birth missing (living people)